Olimpia may refer to:

Sports teams 
Club Atlético Olimpia, a sports club based in Montevideo, Uruguay
Club Deportivo Olimpia, a football team based in Tegucigalpa, Honduras
Club Olimpia, a sports club based in the city of Asunción, Paraguay
Olímpia Futebol Clube, a football team from Brazil
Olimpia Elbląg, a football team from Elbląg, Poland
FC Olimpia Bălţi, a football team from Moldova
FC Olimpia Satu Mare, a football team from Satu Mare, Romania
FC Olimpia Volgograd, a football team from Volgograd, Russia
Olimpia Milano, a basketball team based in Milan, Italy
KK Olimpija, a defunct basketball team based in Ljubljana, Slovenia
Olimpia Basketball Club, a basketball team based in Venado Tuerto, Argentina

Other uses 
 Olimpia Awards, the most important sports awards in Argentina
 Olimpia Sports Hall, an indoor arena in Ploiești, Romania
 Olimpia, Greater Poland Voivodeship (west-central Poland)
 Olímpia, a city in the Brazilian state of São Paulo
 Olimpia, a character in E.T.A. Hoffmann's short story "The Sandman"

See also 
 Olympia (disambiguation)
 Olympus (disambiguation)
 Olympe (disambiguation)